In 2007, Jade Villalon, along with her music partner, Geo, left the project name Sweetbox behind, because of ownership issues, to start work on Jade's new music project, titled under her own name "Jade Valerie".

She released the mini album, Out of the Box, the title being a play on words of the departure from Sweetbox, to critical acclaim in 2007. Her latest album, Bittersweet Symphony, being the 7th original album she's released in her entire career as a singer, proved she continued to make the right career choices, as the album reached high positions such as #15 on the Oricon charts. She re-released Out of the Box (Korean) in Korea, containing some of the tracks from her original album of the same name, as well as many tracks of Bittersweet Symphony . She also re-recorded the song *You Don't Know Me with guest vocalist Kim Dong Wan for this release.

After her continuing success, Jade released the famous Christmas carol Oh Holy Night in Korea near the end of 2008, for the holiday season. She also released information in a video on her official website, that two new albums are to be expected in 2009, and that The Cheetah Girls used a song, on their recent album, that Jade had written in 2003.

Albums

Studio albums

Out Of The Box

Bittersweet Symphony

Eternity

Saint Vox

Singles

Just Another Day
Just Another day was the first single released by Jade Villalon in his solo career for the Out Of The Box album, it was written by herself and Roberto Geo Rosan and has Toby Breitenbach featured as backing vocals.  A promotional video was made for this single.

You Don't Know Me
You Don't Know Me was the second single released by Jade Villalon in his solo career for the Out Of The Box album, it was written by herself and Roberto Geo Rosan and features Kim Dong Wan. The music is also featured in Kim Dong Wan's album, The Secret; Between Us.

Razorman
Razorman was the third and final single released by Jade Villalon in his solo career for the Out Of The Box album, it was written by herself and Roberto Geo Rosan. The music is first featured in Bittersweet Symphony and in 'Out Of The Box was only included in the Korean Edition.

UnbreakableUnbreakable was the first and only single released by Jade Villalon for  Bittersweet Symphony album, it was written by herself and Roberto Geo Rosan. It was based in Moonlight Sonata and a promotional video was made for this single.

Oh Holy NightOh Holy Night is a single released by Jade Villalon in his solo career, it was not featured in any album released by her. It was released in 2008 for the Christmas season in Korean available in digital download.

Wonderful WorldWonderful World is the first single released by Jade Villalon in her Eternity side project for the Self Entitled Eternity album, it was written by herself and Roberto Geo Rosan. The music samples Canon in D Major by Johann Pachelbel. Another Version entitled Wonderful World (Classical Mix 2011) was released as a single.

Love
Love is the seconde single released by Jade Villalon in her Eternity side project for the Self Entitled Eternity album, it was written by herself and Roberto Geo Rosan. The music samples Canon in D Major by Johann Pachelbel.

Only Human
Only Human is the third single released by Jade Villalon in her Eternity side project for the Self Entitled Eternity album, it was written by herself and Roberto Geo Rosan. The music samples Morning Mood by Edvard Greig, the single version of the music was available only in Korean and Taiwan Edition of the album.

I Will
I Will is the fourth single released by Jade Villalon in her Eternity side project for the Self Entitled Eternity album, it was written by herself and Roberto Geo Rosan. The music samples Spring from "The Four Seasons" by Antonio Vivaldi.

Don't Leave Me This Way
Don't Leave Me This Way is the first and only single released by Jade Villalon in her Saint Vox side project in collaboration with Emiri Miyamoto for the Self Entitled Saint Vox album, it was written by herself and Roberto Geo Rosan. The music samples Energy Flow.

Don't Tell Me I'm Wrong
Don't Tell Me I'm Wrong is a single released by Jade Villalon in collaboration with Brian Joo. It was not released in any of her albums, and is featured in Brian Joo's Album: Reborn Part 2.

EP

Bittersweet Symphony

Pop music discographies
Rhythm and blues discographies
Discographies of Filipino artists
Discographies of American artists
Rock music discographies